Arcadiopolis or Arkadiopolis may refer to the following ancient cities, named after the Roman emperor Arcadius, both in modern Turkey :

 Arcadiopolis in Asia, at the modern site of Tire
 Arcadiopolis in Europa, at the modern site of Lüleburgaz